The Ohio to Erie Trail is a dedicated multi-use trail for non-motorized vehicles that traverses the U.S. state of Ohio, from southwest to northeast, crossing  of regional parks, nature preserves, and rural woodland. Construction began in 1991, with sections completed as recently as 2022. 

Named after its endpoints, the trail extends from the Ohio River at Cincinnati to the Lake Erie at Cleveland. Primarily integrating former rail trails and other multi-use trails into a dedicated trail, some segments fall into "route" status, with on-road segments in anticipation of future segregated cycle facilities. The entire Ohio to Erie Trail is intended for bicyclists and hikers, with sections along the path allowing equestrian and horse and buggy traffic.

The trail has multiple surface types including asphalt, cement, concrete, crushed limestone and hard-packed earth.

History
The Ohio to Erie Trail began in 1991 as an outgrowth of the Ohio Bicycle Advisory Council, and was envisioned that year by Edward Franklin Honton, a former Franklin County engineer, who subsequently founded and served as president of a non-profit organization dedicated to developing the trail. After his death in 2005, his legacy continued through the organization he founded, The Ohio to Erie Trail Fund.  The historic Bridgeview Bridge was dedicated in Honton's memory at the opening of the Alum Creek Trail near Innis Park on July 15, 2011. The bridge is a fully restored 1902 structure which originally carried Beach Road and Lucas Road over the Big Darby Creek.

Path
The trail is divided into four separate sections:

Northern leg: Cleveland to Massillon
Heart of Ohio leg: Massillon to Mount Vernon
Central Ohio leg: Mount Vernon to London
Southern leg: London to Cincinnati

The trail passes through regional parks, nature preserves, and other rural woodland. The trail is planned to be  in length. Of that number,  are complete and in daily use,  are either under construction or in engineering design, as of Nov 2016.
By the end of 2022 the Ohio to Erie Trail will have over 90% dedicated bike trails and 3.6% streets and 5.9% rural roads. Of the remaining 31 miles of off trail riding 17 of those miles are on the Fredericksburg to Dalton road section through the scenic Amish countryside. [Ohio to Erie Trail Newsletter, Spring 2022.

See also
 List of rail trails
 Lunken Trail
 Little Miami Scenic Trail
 Xenia Station
 Prairie Grass Trail
 Roberts Pass
 Camp Chase Trail
 Scioto Greenway Trail
 Columbus Downtown Connector Trail
 Alum Creek Greenway Trail
 Westerville Bike trail
 Genoa & Galena Trail
 Heart of Ohio Trail 
 Kokosing Gap Trail
 Holmes County Trail
 Ohio Valley Trails
 Sippo Valley Trail
 Ohio & Erie Canal Towpath Trail
 Cleveland Lakefront Bikeway

References

External links
Ohio to Erie Trail: Official website
Ohio to Erie Trail: Rails-to-Trails Conservancy Trail Link
Original Ohio to Erie Trail website
Ohio to Erie Trail Paper Map
A Path Through Ohio, Second Edition

Bike paths in Ohio
Hiking trails in Ohio
Central Ohio Greenways
Rail trails in Ohio
State parks of Ohio
Greenways
Protected areas of Hamilton County, Ohio
Protected areas of Clermont County, Ohio
Protected areas of Warren County, Ohio
Protected areas of Greene County, Ohio
Protected areas of Clark County, Ohio
Transportation in Hamilton County, Ohio
Transportation in Clermont County, Ohio
Transportation in Warren County, Ohio
Transportation in Greene County, Ohio
Transportation in Clark County, Ohio
Cycling in Cincinnati
1991 establishments in Ohio